"You Don't Have to Worry" is a song by American girl group En Vogue from their debut album, Born to Sing (1990). The song was released as the third single from the album on October 31, 1990, and was the group's third consecutive number-one single on the Billboard Hot R&B/Hip-Hop Songs chart.

"You Don't Have to Worry" spent one week at number one on the Hot R&B/Hip-Hop Songs chart and peaked at number 57 on the Billboard Hot 100. The song is led entirely by Cindy Herron, and in 1991 the group appeared and performed the song on The Oprah Winfrey Show.

Critical reception
In an 2020 retrospective review, Matthew Hocter from Albumism noted the "funky groove" of the song, adding that it's a "continued demonstration of their vocal symbiosis". AllMusic editor Jose F. Promis called it "biting" in his review of Born to Sing. Upon the release, Larry Flick from Billboard complimented it as a "bass-lined funk gem", remarking that "flawless harmonizing softens track's rough-hewn groove foundation, and makes this sound like another radio smash." Pan-European magazine Music & Media declared the song as "mid-tempo dance-pop, in a soulful setting, featuring a bitter-sweet melody and outstanding vocal exercises." Roger Morton from NME wrote, "The Vogue do Janet Jackson but substitute her defiance with a Supremes style quiescence." David Quantick for Smash Hits labeled it as "comparatively active".

Track listings and formats

US 12"Vinyl Single
"You Don't Have To Worry" (Club Nu Breed Mix) — 7:11
"You Don't Have To Worry" (Rhythmus Breedus Mix) — 3:23
"You Don't Have To Worry" (Lo Cal Mix) — 3:58
"You Don't Have To Worry" (LP Version) — 3:46 
UK 7"Vinyl Single
A. "You Don't Have To Worry" — 3:47
B. "Luv Lines" — 4:04

US Cassette Single
A. "You Don't Have To Worry" (Radio Remix Edit) — 4:09
B. "You Don't Have To Worry" (LP Version) — 3:47
Europe CD Maxi-Single
"You Don't Have To Worry" (7" Edit) — 3:45
"You Don't Have To Worry" (UK Edit) — 4:12
"You Don't Have To Worry" (Club Newbreed Mix) — 7:13
"You Don't Have To Worry" (TV Instrumental) — 3-29

Charts

Weekly charts

Year-end charts

See also
List of number-one R&B singles of 1991 (U.S.)

References

1990 singles
1990 songs
En Vogue songs
Atlantic Records singles
Music videos directed by Mark Romanek
Songs written by Denzil Foster
Songs written by Thomas McElroy
Song recordings produced by Foster & McElroy